BLG may refer to:
 Former ISO 639-3 code for Balau, a dialect of the Iban language.
 Barlow Lyde & Gilbert, a British law firm
 Belaga Airport, Sarawak, Malaysia
 Beluga Airport, Alaska
 Beta-lactoglobulin
 Bilibili Gaming, a Chinese esports franchise
 Borden Ladner Gervais, a Canadian law firm
 Burke's Landed Gentry, a genealogical publication